Central South University (CSU) is a national public university in Changsha, Hunan, China. The university is sponsored by the China Ministry of Education. It is a Chinese state Double First Class University. Hunan Medical University, Changsha Railway College, and Central South University of Technology merged to establish Central South University in April 2000.

History 

CSU was established by approval of the State Council on 29 April 2000 by merging three separate universities: Hunan Medical University (HMU), Changsha Railway University (CRU) and Central South University of Technology (CSUT). HMU, formerly under the administration of the Ministry of Health, dates back to 1914 when Xiangya Medical College was founded through the joint efforts of Hunan Yuqun Society and the Yale-China Association. CRU, one of the universities under the administration of the Ministry of Railways, initially restructured in 1953 as Central South College of Civil Engineering and Architecture. It was established in 1960 based on its predecessor's teaching and research divisions. CSUT, one of universities under the administration of the Ministry of Education, was originally named Central South Institute of Mining and Metallurgy in 1952 when a nationwide restructuring of institutes of higher education began. It incorporated departments of mining and metallurgy from six universities including Wuhan University, Sun Yat-sen University, Guangxi University, Hunan University, Nanchang University and Beijing Institute of Technology.

Academics

Central South University (CSU) is a national key university under the direct administration of the Ministry of Education of China and a member of the Double First Class University Plan, former nationally prestigious Project 211 and Project 985. CSU covers an area of 392.4 hectares with campuses located across the Xiang River at the base of the Yuelu Hill close to its neighbor Hunan University.

CSU offers 83 bachelor's degrees, 282 master's degrees and 142 doctorate degrees from 31 colleges and institutes and a graduate school:

Literature and Journalism
Foreign Languages
Architecture and Art
Business School
Law School
Marxism
Public Administration 
Mathematics and Statistics
Physics and Electronics
Chemistry and Chemical Engineering
Mechanical and Electrical Engineering
Energy Science and Engineering
Material Science and Engineering
Powder Metallurgy Research Institute
Traffic and Transportation Engineering
Civil Engineering
Metallurgy and Environment
Geoscience and Environmental Engineering
Info-physics and Geomatics Engineering
Resources and Safety Engineering
Minerals Processing and Bioengineering
Information Science and Engineering
Xiang-ya School of Medicine
Pharmaceutical Sciences
Public Health
Basic Medical Sciences
Stomatology
School of Life Sciences
Research Department of Physical Education
School of Aeronautics and Astronautics
Aier School of Ophthalmology

Faculties and students
More than 33,000 full-time undergraduates and 12,000 graduate students attend Central South University. Of the total number attending CSU approximately 1,000 are foreign students. The faculty-student ratio is about 1:8.

Facilities

CSU covers an area of 3,810,000 square meters and has the total floor space of 2,330,000 square meters. The library of CSU have a collection of more than 4,390,000 volumes.

CSU has six campuses: 
 Main campus: dormitories and academic buildings for junior undergraduates and postgraduates of most engineering schools, two state key laboratories, as well as office buildings.
 South campus: dormitories for all freshman and postgraduates of all humanities schools, as well as office buildings.
 New campus: academic buildings for all freshman and all humanities and science postgraduates, as well as office and library buildings.
 Xiangya School of Medicine (New campus): dormitories and academic buildings for medical postgraduates, with Xiangya Hospital and the State Key Laboratory of Medical Genetics of China.
 Xiangya School of Medicine (Old campus): dormitories and academic buildings for medical undergraduates, with Third Xiangya Hospital and medical library.
 Railway campus: dormitories and academic buildings for junior undergraduates and postgraduates of civil engineering, traffic engineering, software engineering, and architecture, as well as office and library buildings.

Notable alumni

Academics
Tang Feifan, medical microbiologist, best known for culturing the Chlamydia trachomatis agent in the yolk sacs of eggs, one of the earliest academician of Chinese Academy of Sciences.
Zhang Xiaoqian, gastroenterologist, is considered the founder of gastroenterology in China. He served as President of Hsiang-Ya Medical College and Vice President of Peking Union Medical College, and was a founding member of both Academia Sinica and the Chinese Academy of Sciences.
Huang Boyun, powder metallurgist, academician of Chinese Academy of Engineering, former President of the Central South University.
Jin Zhanpeng, materials scientist, academician of Chinese Academy of Sciences.
Wang Dianzuo, mineral engineering scientist, academician of Chinese Academy of Sciences, Chinese Academy of Engineering and National Academy of Engineering, former President of Central South University of Technology (now merged into the Central South university).
Chen Zhiwu, professor of Finance at Yale School of Management and an influential public intellectual in China.

Politics and Public Service
Guo Shengkun, member of Politburo of the Chinese Communist Party, Central Secretariat secretary, Secretary of the Central Political and Legal Affairs Commission of the Communist Party of China.
Lu Zhangong, Vice Chairman of the Chinese People's Political Consultative Conference, former Communist Party Secretary of Fujian and Henan provinces. 
Zhao Lijian, Deputy Director of Foreign Ministry Information Department of the People's Republic of China, Foreign Ministry Spokesperson of the People's Republic of China.

Business and entrepreneurship

Wang Chuanfu, Founder and CEO of BYD.
Liang Wengen, Founder and Chairman of Sany Group.
Sun Qin, Chairman of China National Nuclear Corporation.
Li Changjin, Chairman of China Railway Engineering Corporation.

Global Rankings 

US News Ranking: 209 (2023)

QS Ranking: 499（2023）

THES Ranking: 301–350（2022）

ARWU Ranking: 101–150（2022）

References

External links

Central South University official website 
Central South University official website 

 
Universities in China with English-medium medical schools
Project 211
Project 985
Plan 111
Universities and colleges in Hunan
Universities and colleges in Changsha
Vice-ministerial universities in China
2000 establishments in China
Yuelu District